The 2000 FIG Rhythmic Gymnastics World Cup Final was the fourth edition of the Rhythmic Gymnastics World Cup Final, held in December 2000 in Glasgow, United Kingdom, at the Braehead Arena. The competition was officially organized by the International Gymnastics Federation under a different format compared to the previous editions. While the first three Rhythmic Gymnastics World Cup tournaments were standalone events, in 1997 the FIG Executive Committee made the decision to hold the 2000 World Cup Final event as the last stage of a series of competitions through the 1999–2000 season.

Medalists

Medal table

References

Rhythmic Gymnastics World Cup
International gymnastics competitions hosted by the United Kingdom
2000 in gymnastics